Sushi repeat-containing protein SRPX is a protein that in humans is encoded by the SRPX gene. Bioinformatics analysis suggests the SRPX protein is a peroxiredoxin.

References

Further reading

Extracellular matrix proteins